Thomas Thornton Reed CBE (9 September 1902 – 19 August 1995) was an Anglican bishop.

Early life 
Reed was educated at the Collegiate School of St Peter, Adelaide and Trinity College, University of Melbourne. He was ordained in 1927 and after a curacy at St Augustine's, Unley he was  priest in charge of the Berri Mission then a resident tutor at St Mark's College, University of Adelaide. From 1936 to 1954 he held incumbencies at Henley Beach and Rose Park. He was then successively an archdeacon and dean before becoming the Bishop of Adelaide. He was consecrated a bishop on 30 May 1957 at St Peter's Cathedral, Adelaide. When the Province of South Australia included three dioceses with the creation of the Diocese of the Murray his position became that of Archbishop of Adelaide.

References

 
 

 

1902 births
1995 deaths
People educated at Rossall School
People educated at St Peter's College, Adelaide
People educated at Trinity College (University of Melbourne)
Alumni of the University of Liverpool
Anglican archdeacons in Australia
Deans of Adelaide
20th-century Anglican bishops in Australia
20th-century Anglican archbishops
Anglican bishops of Adelaide
Anglican archbishops of Adelaide
Commanders of the Order of the British Empire